Cuadros is a surname. Notable people with the surname include:

Álvaro Cuadros (born 1995), Spanish cyclist
Diego Cuadros (born 1996), Colombian soccer player
Enrique Torres Cuadros (born 1957), Mexican politician
Gil Cuadros (1962–1996), American gay Latino poet, essayist, and ceramist
Héctor Cuadros (born 1983), Mexican soccer player
Karielys Cuadros (born 1996), Venezuelan beauty pageant titleholder
Manuel Rodríguez Cuadros (born 1949), Peruvian diplomat